Pablo d'Ors (born 1963) is a Spanish priest, theologian and writer. He was born in Madrid; his grandfather was the essayist and art critic Eugenio d'Ors. He was educated in New York, Rome, Prague and Vienna. As a novelist, d'Ors has published half a dozen titles. His debut novel Las ideas puras was nominated for the Premio Herralde.

References

1963 births
Living people
20th-century Spanish Roman Catholic theologians
21st-century Spanish Roman Catholic priests
Spanish male novelists
Spanish translators
21st-century translators
21st-century Spanish Roman Catholic theologians
21st-century Spanish novelists
Writers from Madrid
21st-century Spanish male writers
20th-century Spanish Roman Catholic priests